George E. Saurman (January 15, 1926  October 3, 2022) was a Republican member of the Pennsylvania House of Representatives.

He was also a published author.

References

1926 births
2022 deaths
Republican Party members of the Pennsylvania House of Representatives
Politicians from Houston